= News station =

The term news station may refer to:

- An all-news radio station
- A television station devoted to news broadcasting, such as CNN or BBC News 24
- A local television station, particularly in the United States; a common but somewhat inaccurate reference: local stations do carry other network or syndicated programs, although their local programming may indeed be limited to news; see Category:Television stations in the United States
